Robert Bogey (born 26 November 1935) is a French former long-distance runner who competed in the 1960 Summer Olympics.

References

External links
 

1935 births
Living people
Olympic athletes of France
Athletes (track and field) at the 1960 Summer Olympics
French male long-distance runners
Mediterranean Games gold medalists for France
Mediterranean Games medalists in athletics
Athletes (track and field) at the 1959 Mediterranean Games
20th-century French people